The Grenfell, built on the Peace River, for the Peace River Trading Company, was the first commercial steamship on the Peace River that was not built for the Hudson's Bay Company.  

The impassible Vermilion Chutes divides the Peace River into two navigable sections. She subsequently burned before she could be refloated.

References

Steamships of Canada